Tony Dawson is a basketball player.

Tony Dawson may also refer to:

Tony Dawson (tennis) in 1968 Australian Championships – Men's Singles
Tony Dawson (physician)
Tony Dawson, presenter on CBC Radio One local programming
Tony Dawson, candidate in Sefton Council election, 2012
Tony Dawson of Vetter Software

See also
Anthony Dawson (disambiguation)
Tony Dawson-Harrison